The Christmas Aeroplane Company was an American aircraft manufacturer.

History
It was founded in October 1909 to produce an aircraft, initially with $1,200 in funding, followed by an additional $2,500. Its founder Dr. William Whitney Christmas had claimed to build and fly his first aircraft, the "Red Bird I" in 1908 becoming the second person to fly an aircraft after the Wright Brothers. The Christmas aeroplane company built its first aircraft, the "Red Bird II" at College Park Maryland with a claimed flight on 15 October 1911. The "Red Bird III" was built in the spring of 1912, with a contract from the U.S. Postal service to deliver Air Mail.

Aircraft

References

Defunct aircraft manufacturers of the United States
Aviation in Washington, D.C.
American companies established in 1909
1909 establishments in Washington, D.C.
Manufacturing companies disestablished in 1912
1912 disestablishments in Washington, D.C.
Manufacturing companies established in 1909